alfabeta was a monthly cultural and literary magazine published between 1979 and 1988 in Milan, Italy. The magazine was the cultural landmark in the country during its existence.

History and profile
alfabeta was established in Milan by Nanni Balestrini in May 1988. It was originally published by Multhipla and then Intrapresa. The editorial board included Maria Corti, Umberto Eco, Francesco Leonetti, Antonio Porta, Pier Aldo Rovatti and Paolo Volponi.

alfabeta produced in-depth articles about culture, philosophy and politics along with previews and reviews of books, contemporary art exhibitions, theatre shows and cinema. Poet Gian Mario Villalta started his career as a contributor to the magazine in 1986.

alfabeta ceased publication in 1988 and the last issue appeared in December that year. Its successor is alfabeta2 which was launched in 2010.

See also
 List of magazines in Italy

References

1979 establishments in Italy
1988 disestablishments in Italy
Defunct literary magazines published in Italy
Italian-language magazines
Magazines established in 1979
Magazines disestablished in 1988
Magazines published in Milan
Monthly magazines published in Italy
Contemporary art magazines